Kocielizna  is a settlement in the administrative district of Gmina Kleszczów, within Bełchatów County, Łódź Voivodeship, in central Poland.

References

Kocielizna